Major General Claude Ian Hurley Dunbar  (1909–1971) was Commandant of the British Sector in Berlin.

Military career
Dunbar was commissioned into the Scots Guards in 1929.

He served in World War II becoming Commanding Officer of 1st Bn Scots Guards in 1943 and Commanding Officer of 3rd Bn Scots Guards in 1943.

After the War he reverted to being Commanding Officer of 1 Bn Scots Guards and then became Assistant Quartermaster General for London District in 1948. He was made Commander of 2nd Guards Brigade in 1949 and Commander 4th Guards Brigade in 1950.

He went on to command the Scots Guards Regiment and Regimental District in 1952 and became Brigadier in charge of Administration at Eastern Command in 1954. He was appointed General Officer Commanding 42nd (Lancashire) Division in 1959 and General Officer Commanding North West District in 1960. Finally he became Commandant of the British Sector in Berlin in 1962; he retired in 1963.

Family
He was married to Susan.

References

 

|-
 

1909 births
1971 deaths
Companions of the Order of the Bath
Commanders of the Order of the British Empire
Companions of the Distinguished Service Order
British Army major generals
Scots Guards officers
British Army personnel of World War II